Byara District is a district of the Halabja Governorate, in Kurdistan Region, Iraq. Its hub is the city of Byara.

Cities 
 Byara
 Tawella

External links 
 Aawsat (Arabic)

Geography of Iraqi Kurdistan
Districts of Halabja Province